Regino may refer to:

Regino (river), small coastal river in the department of Haute-Corse, Corsica, France

People
April Boy Regino (1961–2020), Filipino singer
Jacinto Regino Pachano (1835–1903), Venezuelan writer and politician
Regino of Prüm (died 915), Benedictine churchman
Regino C. Hermosisima, Jr. (born 1927), Filipino judge 
Regino Díaz Relova (1874–1961), Filipino military officer 
Regino Garcia (1840–1916), Filipino artist, botanist and forester 
Regino García (1875–?), Cuban baseball catcher 
Regino Hernández (born 1991), Spanish snowboarder 
Regino Pedroso (1896–1983), Cuban poet 
Regino Ramirez, Texas, a census-designated place the United States
Regino Sainz de la Maza (1896–1981), Spanish classical guitarist and composer
Regino Ylanan (1889–1963), Filipino athlete, physician and sports administrator 
Regino (footballer) (born 1988), Spanish footballer born José Franco Gómez